Loretto Petrucci (18 August 1929 – 17 June 2016) was an Italian professional road bicycle racer who won Milan–San Remo in 1952 and 1953.

Palmarès 

 1950
 3rd, Coppa Bernocchi
 3rd, Giro del Piemonte

 1951
 1st, Giro di Toscana
 1st, GP Massaua-Fossati
 3rd, Milan–San Remo
 3rd, Trofeo Baracchi

 1952
 1st, Milan–San Remo
 2nd, Tour of Flanders
 2nd, Trofeo Baracchi

 1953
 1st, Overall, Challenge Desgrange-Colombo
 2nd, Giro del Piemonte
 1st, Milan–San Remo
 3rd, National Championship, Road, Elite, Italy
 2nd, Milano–Torino
 2nd, Giro di Campania
 1st, Paris–Brussels
 3rd, La Flèche Wallonne

 1955
 1st, Giro del Lazio

References

External links 

Italian male cyclists
1929 births
2016 deaths
People from Pistoia
Sportspeople from the Province of Pistoia
Challenge Desgrange-Colombo winners
Cyclists from Tuscany